Katsuura Dam is an earthfill dam located in Chiba Prefecture in Japan. The dam is used for irrigation. The catchment area of the dam is 1 km2. The dam impounds about 20  ha of land when full and can store 1966 thousand cubic meters of water. The construction of the dam was started on 1966 and completed in 1975.

References

Dams in Chiba Prefecture
1975 establishments in Japan